is a Japanese professional football club based in Suzuka, Mie Prefecture. They play in the Japan Football League, Japanese fourth tier of football league.

History 

The club was originally established in Nabari, Mie in 1980 under the name Mie Club, and it became a member of Mie Football Association to join the Mie prefectural league in 1982. The club went up to the top division in 1991 and remained there until 2005, when local organisers kicked off the idea of developing a larger and more ambitious football team.

The region to the southwest of Nagoya has been traditionally very populous but still undeveloped from a football perspective despite a number of successes by local high school football. In mid- 2005, a group of local businessmen, football fans and coaches from Mie Prefecture, who were eager to put together a team to represent the area, approached Bunji Kimura, an ex-football manager of Kyoto Sanga F.C. and Yokohama Flügels. Kimura was convinced to accept the position of the president and technical director of a club that was then going by the name of "W.S.C. Nabari Admiral". Kimura plunged in and began a very ambitious project to transform the team from a bunch of amateur kickers in a tiny town to a much more competitive and tightly-run organisation representing the aspirations of the entire prefecture.

At Kimura's insistence, the team in February 2006 took the name "MIE FC Rampole", taking its name from the famous Japanese mystery novel writer Rampo Edogawa, who was born in Mie Prefecture. The part "ole" of the name is supposedly a Spanish word "Olé" used to cheer and applaud (cf. Consadole Sapporo). Following the name change the club launched its official website on February 22. Kimura quickly began drawing upon his network of J.League contacts to bring in more experienced coaches and organisers, and by the end of his first season in charge the club advanced to the second division of the Tōkai Regional League.

Whereas its progress on the pitch has stalled temporarily, with third-place finishes in both 2007 and 2008, the club has been focusing most of its attention on the organisational goals. An independent corporation was established in 2006, fulfilling one of the requirements of J. League Associate Membership, and in 2008 the team merged with nearby Suzuka Club, thereby absorbing a youth program that can help to meet another key requirement. Following the merger, the team announced on September 1, 2008, that it changed its name to "F.C. Suzuka Rampole" and moved its home playing ground from Ueno Athletic Park Stadium to Suzuka Sports Garden from 2009 season. The club carried out the move since first, Suzuka is the city world-famous for the F1 circuit located outside town, and second, its population base and location, squarely in the middle of Mie Prefecture's main population centres is considered to be ideal.

On January 28, 2016, the team announced an immediate change of the team's name to Suzuka Unlimited FC(鈴鹿アンリミテッドFC).

With the appointment of coach Milagros "Mila" Martínez from the 2019 season, the club was the first and to date only in any of Japan's national level divisions to have a female leading the club.

On February 1, 2020, the club announced that it would change its name to Suzuka Point Getters (鈴鹿ポイントゲッターズ). Their logo and attire were updated to reflect Suzuka's status as home of the Suzuka Circuit.

On July 5, 2021, Suzuka announced Martínez's departure by mutual consent after her contract lapsed and published her gratitude to Point Getter fans throughout her tenure. Ten days later, former J3 League coach Yasutoshi Miura was hired to succeed her and also be Suzuka's general manager.

League and cup record 

Key

Honours 
  Tōkai League Division 2
 2009
 Tōkai Soccer League Division 1
 2012, 2014, 2017, 2018
Shakaijin Cup
 2017

Current squad 
As of 21 January 2023.

Coaching Staff

Managerial history

References

External links 
Official Website 
Japan Regional Leagues: Tōkai League

 
Football clubs in Japan
Association football clubs established in 1980
1980 establishments in Japan
Sports teams in Mie Prefecture
Japan Football League clubs
Sport in Suzuka, Mie